Centerdale is an unincorporated community in Cedar County, Iowa, United States.

History
Centerdale (historically spelled Centredale) was settled in the early 1850s.

Centerdale was platted at the time the Burlington, Cedar Rapids and Northern Railway arrived. Centerdale's population was 16 in 1902, and 15 in 1925.

References

Unincorporated communities in Cedar County, Iowa
Unincorporated communities in Iowa
1850s establishments in Iowa